Ravne is a settlement in the Municipality of Ajdovščina in the Littoral region of Slovenia.

The local church is dedicated to Saints John and Paul and belongs to the Parish of Črniče.

References

External links 
Ravne at Geopedia

Populated places in the Municipality of Ajdovščina